”Through the Long Days” is a song written by the English composer Edward Elgar in 1885 as his Op.16, No.2.  The words are from a poem by the American writer and statesman John Hay.

The song was composed when Elgar was on holiday at the home of his friend Dr. Charles Buck at Settle between 10–31 August 1885.  It was in memory of a mutual friend, Jack Baguley, who had just died.

The song, together with Like to the Damask Rose, was first performed by Charles Phillips at St. James's Hall on 25 February 1897.

It was first published by Stanley Lucas (London) in 1887, dedicated to the Rev. E. Vine Hall. When he received the first copies from the publisher, Elgar inscribed one of them to "Miss Roberts from Edward Elgar, Mar 21 1887". It was re-published by Ascherberg in 1890, then in 1907 as one of the Seven Lieder of Edward Elgar, with English and German words.

Lyrics

German words by Ed. Sachs

Elgar expanded the original poem, which had just the first three lines of each verse.

See also
Works by John Hay - at Project Gutenberg has the poem "Through the Long Days and Years"

Recordings
Songs and Piano Music by Edward Elgar has "Through the Long Days"  performed by Mark Wilde (tenor), with David Owen Norris (piano).
The Songs of Edward Elgar SOMM CD 220 Neil Mackie (tenor) with Malcolm Martineau (piano), at Southlands College, London, April 1999

References

Banfield, Stephen, Sensibility and English Song: Critical studies of the early 20th century (Cambridge University Press, 1985) 
Kennedy, Michael, Portrait of Elgar (Oxford University Press, 1968) 
Moore, Jerrold N. “Edward Elgar: a creative life” (Oxford University Press, 1984)

External links

Notes

Songs by Edward Elgar
1885 songs